Junoon for Peace is the first live album and the eleventh overall album by the Pakistani band, Junoon. The album was recorded live on October 27, 2001.

The concert was a tribute to the victims of the World Trade Center attack and a call for an end to the subsequent discrimination faced by Arabs and South Asians in United States. it was a call for peace on all fronts.

Background
Following the 9/11 attacks, Junoon helped to organise a concert at the General Assembly on UN Day with Junoon and an Indian group performing at the Assembly Hall, a first of its kind. They also released their what they called their first English-language single, "No More", an anti-violence song which deals directly with the events of that day. Three days later, Junoon performed live and sang songs from their previous albums and those were included in this live album. The band released this album to pay tribute to the victims of the 9/11 attacks and a call for an end to the discrimination of the Arabs and South Asians by the Americans.

Track listing
All music written & composed by Salman Ahmad, Ali Azmat and Sabir Zafar, those which are not are mentioned below.

Personnel
All information is taken from the CD.

Junoon
Salman Ahmad - vocals, lead guitar
Ali Azmat - vocals, backing vocals
Brian O'Connell - bass guitar, backing vocals

Production
Produced by Salman Ahmad
Recorded and Mixed at Allience Francaise in New York City, New York, United States

External links
 Junoon's Official Website

Junoon (band) live albums
Junoon (band) video albums
2001 live albums
Urdu-language albums